Stefan Pac (c. 1587–17 November 1640) was a Polish–Lithuanian nobleman, politician and magnate.

He was the private secretary of King Sigismund III of Poland since 1611, Grand Clerk of Lithuania since 1615, Recorder of Lithuania since 1626, Court Treasurer of Lithuania since 1630, Grand Treasurer of Lithuania since 1630 and eventually the Deputy Chancellor of Lithuania since 1635.

Marshal of the Sejm (extraordinary) on 13–18 November 1629 in Warsaw.

See also 

 Lithuanian nobility

References 

1580s births
1640 deaths
Stefan
Deputy Chancellors of the Grand Duchy of Lithuania
Grand Treasurers of the Grand Duchy of Lithuania